Deudorix perse (formerly Virachola perse), the large guava blue, is a species of lycaenid or blue butterfly found in the Indomalayan realm.
It was described by William Chapman Hewitson in 1863. The larva feeds on Randia dumetorum.

Description

Subspecies
 D. p. perse India to Thailand
 D. p. ghela Fruhstorfer, 1912 Ceylon, South India 
 D. p. maseas Fruhstorfer, 1912

References 

Deudorigini
Butterflies described in 1863
Butterflies of Asia
Taxa named by William Chapman Hewitson